Likhutloaneng is a community council located in the Mohale's Hoek District of Lesotho. Its population in 2006 was 7,937.

Villages
The community of Likhutloaneng includes the villages of:

Boluka-Hlapi
Ha 'Malane
Ha 'Matholoana
Ha Elia
Ha Isao
Ha Khajoane
Ha Khosi
Ha Kou
Ha Lepekola
Ha Leronti
Ha Lesuoa
Ha Lethola
Ha Luka
Ha Mahlokolo
Ha Makepe
Ha Malefane
Ha Malefetsane
Ha Mapaloe
Ha Marathane
Ha Maritinyane

Ha Masilo
Ha Mathibane
Ha Matitimisa
Ha Moeketsi
Ha Mofolane
Ha Mokukutoana
Ha Motšoane
Ha Mpheulane
Ha Ngoan'a-Ntloana
Ha Nkesi
Ha Nkonyana
Ha Notši
Ha Ntaoana
Ha Ntja
Ha Ntšokolo
Ha Posholi
Ha Ralemati
Ha Ramafole / Ha Ntoana
Ha Ramokhele

Ha Seferi
Ha Sekoli
Ha Selalome
Ha Sello
Ha Senyeka
Ha Setene
Ha Setsoto
Ha Titimise (Moreneng)
Ha Titimise (Sekhutlong)
Ha Tota
Ha Tsie
Heising
Koung
Lekhalong
Letsatseng
Letsoapong (Ha Maleli)
Letsoapong (Ha Moiketsi)
Likhutloaneng
Likoepereng

Liphamoleng
Lithakong
Litooaneng
Makhalong
Makheka
Maluke
Manganeng
Masaleng
Meeling
Mokopung
Qapane
Ramafole
Sefateng
Sekhutlong
Thaba-Ntšo (Ha Tumo)
Topa (Ha Nkuebe)
Topa (Likhutloaneng)
Topa (Makhalong)
Tšenekeng

References

External links
 Google map of community villages

Populated places in Mohale's Hoek District